Zombie Blues is a rock band founded by the Australian philosopher and cognitive scientist David Chalmers, who serves as the lead singer of the band. Its name comes from Chalmers' philosophical zombie thought experiment—a hypothetical creature that looks like humans but lacks consciousness.

The band's only song, "The Zombie Blues", has been performed at various cognitive science and philosophy conventions, including Qualia Fest. Its core lyrics include:

The Irish Times wrote, "With his leather jacket and biker’s haircut, David Chalmers is about the closest thing philosophy has to a rock star these days."

References

External links
 A live performance of the Zombie Blues featuring the New York Consciousness Collective

Australian rock music groups
Blues rock groups